Yao Thomas Amegnaglo (born 31 October 1991) is a professional footballer who plays as a midfielder and defender for Championnat National 2 club GOAL FC. Born in Ghana, he is a former Togo youth international.

Club career 
In 2017, Amegnaglo was unable to sign for Irish club Finn Harps due to work permit issues.

International career 
Amegnaglo was a youth international for the under-20 team of Togo.

Career statistics

References

External links 
 
 
 

1991 births
Living people
Togolese footballers
Association football defenders
Association football midfielders
AS Douanes (Togo) players
Chippa United F.C. players
Banbury United F.C. players
GOAL FC players
Hyères FC players
Primera Catalana players
Championnat National 2 players
Togolese expatriate footballers
Togolese expatriate sportspeople in South Africa
Expatriate soccer players in South Africa
Togolese expatriate sportspeople in England
Expatriate footballers in England
Togolese expatriate sportspeople in France
Expatriate footballers in France
Expatriate footballers in Spain
21st-century Togolese people